Bop Doo-Wopp is the eighth studio album by The Manhattan Transfer, released in 1984 on the Atlantic Records label. Six of the ten tracks on Bop Doo-Wopp are live performances.

The album contains the song "Route 66" which originally appeared on the soundtrack to the Burt Reynolds film Sharky's Machine.

The album is essentially a live album (6 tracks) with some additional studio cuts (4 tracks). Five tracks were recorded live at the Nakano Sun Plaza in Japan in November 1983. Songs from these concerts were also released in 1996 on their album Man-Tora! Live in Tokyo. The other live cut, "Duke of Dubuque", was recorded for the Evening at Pops series on PBS.  The song "Safronia B" was recorded in Sydney, Australia in December 1983.  The other three songs were recorded in New York City.

Charts
This album spawned another Billboard Hot 100 single in "Baby Come Back to Me (The Morse Code of Love)" which reached #83 on the chart in February 1985. The song was dedicated to The Capris (an Italian vocal group from Queens) who wrote and recorded it in 1982, and whose single "There's a Moon Out Tonight" was a top 10 hit in 1961.

Awards
Route 66 hit the Billboard Hot 100 in 1982, reaching #78, and earned the group another Grammy Award in the category of "Best Jazz Vocal Performance, Duo or Group."

Track listing

Personnel 
The Manhattan Transfer
 Cheryl Bentyne – vocals, vocal arrangements (6, 10)
 Tim Hauser – vocals, musical arrangements (1), vocal arrangements (6, 8, 9, 10)
 Alan Paul – vocals, vocal arrangements (6, 10)
 Janis Siegel – vocals, musical arrangements (1), vocal arrangements (3-6, 10)

Musicians
 Yaron Gershovsky – keyboards, conductor, musical arrangements (2, 5, 6, 7, 9, 10)
 Jon Mayer – acoustic piano
 Tom Kellock – synthesizers
 Ira Newborn – guitars, musical arrangements (3, 8)
 Wayne Johnson – guitars, musical arrangements (4)
 Alex Blake – bass
 Andy Muson – bass
 Jim Nelson – drums
 Art Rodriguez – drums, additional backing vocals (7)
 Don Roberts – woodwinds, additional backing vocals (7)
 Al Capps – vocal arrangements (1)
 Richard Cole – vocal arrangements (2)
 Phil Mattson – vocal arrangements (2)
 John Cutcliffe – additional backing vocals (7)

Production 
 Producers – Tim Hauser (Tracks 1, 2 & 4–10); Richard Perry and Tim Hauser (Track 3).
 Tracking and Remix – Elliot Scheiner
 Engineers – Howard Steele (Track 3) and Richard Lush (Track 7).
 Second Engineers on Track 7 – Glen Holguin and Richard Muecke.
 Tracking Engineer on Tracks 1, 2, 5, 8 & 9 – Kenichi Matsuda
 Monitor Engineer on Tracks 1, 2, 5, 8 & 9 – Pete Winer
 House Engineer on Tracks 1, 2, 5, 8 & 9 – Dan Kasting
 Mastered by Bernie Grundman at A&M Studios (Los Angeles, CA).
 Art Direction – Bob Defrin
 Cover Illustration – Leslie Cabarga
 Management – Brian Avnet

References / Sources
 The Manhattan Transfer Official Website

The Manhattan Transfer albums
1984 albums
Albums produced by Richard Perry
Atlantic Records albums